Joe Taitano San Agustin (15 October 1930 – 15 April 2021) was a Guamanian politician, member of the Democratic Party of Guam. San Agustin served as Speaker in the 20th, 21st, and 22nd Guam Legislatures and Senator in the Guam Legislature for 10 consecutive terms.

Early life
San Agustin was born on 15 October 1930 to Candido Sanchez San Agustin (1907–1986) and Maria Pangelinan Taitano  (1907–1994) of Agana.

Personal life
San Agustin was married to Carmen Santos Shimizu and they had five children, including their many grandchildren and great-grandchildren and great great grandchild. San Agustin's son Joe Shimizu San Agustin is a Senator from the 34th, 35th, and 36th Guam Legislature.

Government of Guam/Public Service
Chairman, Board of Trustees, Government of Guam Retirement Fund from 2004 to 2019;
Executive Director of the Guam Base Reuse and Closure (BRAC);
Director of Administration; 
Chairman, Board of Directors, Guam Power Authority;
Acting Secretary of Guam during Governor Guerrero's term;
Director, Bureau of Budget Management and Research, Government of Guam;
Chief, Budget and Management Office, Government of Guam;

Guam Legislature
San Agustin first successfully ran as a senator in the Guam Legislature in 1976 and was re-elected 9 times thereafter. He served as Speaker of the Guam Legislature in 3 successive terms, from 1989 to 1995.

Elections

Leadership roles

Private Sector
Bank of Guam Board of Directors, 1972 to 2017;
Organizer and First President, GovGuam Federal Credit Union now known as Coast 360;
Chairman, Board of Directors, Guam Greyhound, Inc.
Chairman, Board of Directors, Guam Aqua Research, Inc.

Educational career
After retiring as a Senator, San Agustin was an adjunct professor at the University of Guam for the School of Business and Public Administration up to 2019.

References

1930 births
2021 deaths
20th-century American politicians
Chamorro people
Guamanian Democrats
Members of the Legislature of Guam
Speakers of the Legislature of Guam